Wong Fei Hung – Master of Kung Fung (Traditional Chinese: 我師傅係黃飛鴻) is a TVB costume action series released overseas in November 2004 and broadcast on TVB Jade in January 2005.

Synopsis
Wong Fei-hung (Bosco Wong) is a hotheaded youth with a fully developed sense of justice who is beginning to show the qualities of the famous hero he will become in the future. After his mother’s death, Fei-Hung has followed his father, Wong Kei-ying (David Chiang), formerly known as one of the "Guangdong Tiger", to earn a living by performing martial arts and selling medicine on the streets travelling from province to province, seemingly aimlessly. After many years they return to their home village in Fushan to pay their respects to Wong Fei-Hung's deceased mother.

Wong Kei-Ying is somewhat reluctant to return to Fushan and is eager to leave. Having previously lived a nomadic life, Fei-Hung was eager to stay and make some friends in Foshan. They meet up with Fei Hung's aunt Tang Yu-Bo (Winnie Young) who has just returned from France to open a western cafe. Yu-Bo helps Fei-Hung to convince his father to stay. So Kei-Ying and Fei-Hung's new life in Fushan begins...

Cast

External links
TVB.com Wong Fei Hung - Master of Kung Fu - Official Website 

TVB dramas
Martial arts television series
2005 Hong Kong television series debuts
2005 Hong Kong television series endings